Kayalı is a village in the İdil District of Şırnak Province in Turkey. The village is populated by Kurds of the Dorikan tribe and had a population of 433 in 2021.

History 
The village was historically populated by Assyrians.

References

Villages in İdil District
Kurdish settlements in Şırnak Province
Tur Abdin
Historic Assyrian communities in Turkey